Großeibstadt is a municipality in the district of Rhön-Grabfeld in Bavaria in Germany. The river Franconian Saale flows through Kleineibstadt.

The municipality consists of the following villages: Großeibstadt and Kleineibstadt. The township is a member of the administrative community called "Verwaltungsgemeinschaft" Saal an der Saale.

References

Rhön-Grabfeld